The 2021 France wildfires are multiple wildfires happening in Provence-Alpes-Côte d'Azur, France, mainly in Saint Tropez. Two people died during the fires.

Timeline

August
On August 17, 2021, a devastating forest fire broke out, with a flame as high as 20 meters, in Provence-Alpes-Côte d'Azur near Saint-Tropez.
Thousands of people were evacuated, in particular the villages around Cavalaire, Saint-Tropez, Grimaud and La Môle were evacuated.
The Var prefecture also confirmed the evacuation of several campsites and urged people to avoid the roads adjacent to the Gulf of Saint-Tropez so as not to hinder rescue.
About 750 firefighters are fighting the fires that destroyed a wooded area of 3,500 hectares.

References

2021 fires in Europe
2021 wildfires
2021 wildfires
21st century in Provence-Alpes-Côte d'Azur
Wildfires
Saint-Tropez
2021